Anil Mondal (born 4 August 1951) is an Indian weightlifter. He competed at the 1972 Summer Olympics and the 1976 Summer Olympics.

References

External links
 

1951 births
Living people
Indian male weightlifters
Olympic weightlifters of India
Weightlifters at the 1972 Summer Olympics
Weightlifters at the 1976 Summer Olympics
Place of birth missing (living people)
Commonwealth Games medallists in weightlifting
Commonwealth Games silver medallists for India
Weightlifters at the 1974 British Commonwealth Games
20th-century Indian people
21st-century Indian people
Medallists at the 1974 British Commonwealth Games